Pronocera collaris is a species of long-horned beetle in the family Cerambycidae. It is found in North America.

Subspecies
These two subspecies belong to the species Pronocera collaris:
 Pronocera collaris collaris (Kirby in Richardson, 1837)
 Pronocera collaris lecontei Chemsak, 1963

References

Further reading

 
 

Callidiini
Articles created by Qbugbot
Beetles described in 1837